Brian Wrigglesworth ( – 1 December 2015) was an English professional rugby league footballer who played in the 1950s, 1960s and 1970s, and coached in the 1970s.

Playing career
Wrigglesworth made his début for Featherstone Rovers on Monday 29 August 1966, and he played his last match for Featherstone Rovers during the  1970–71 season, he appears to have scored no drop-goals (or field-goals as they are currently known in Australasia), but prior to the 1974–75 season all goals, whether; conversions, penalties, or drop-goals, scored 2-points, consequently prior to this date drop-goals were often not explicitly documented, therefore '0' drop-goals may indicate drop-goals not recorded, rather than no drop-goals scored.

County honours

Challenge Cup Final appearances
Wrigglesworth played  in Featherstone Rovers' 17-12 victory over Barrow in the 1966–67 Challenge Cup Final during the 1966–67 season at Wembley Stadium, London on Saturday 13 May 1967, in front of a crowd of 76,290.

County Cup Final appearances
Wrigglesworth played left-, i.e. number 4, and scored a try in Featherstone Rovers' 12-25 defeat by Hull Kingston Rovers in the 1966–67 Yorkshire County Cup Final during the 1966–67 season at Headingley Rugby Stadium, Leeds on Saturday 15 October 1966.

Genealogical information
Brian Wrigglesworth's marriage to Katherine (née Hancock) was registered during third ¼ 1956 in Pontefract district. They had children; Christopher Wrigglesworth (birth registered during third ¼  in Pontefract district), and Karen Wrigglesworth (birth registered during second ¼  in Pontefract district). Brian Wrigglesworth's funeral service took place at Pontefract Crematorium, Wakefield Road, Pontefract at 11:20am on Tuesday 15 December 2015.

References

External links

Search for "Wrigglesworth" at rugbyleagueproject.org
Reunion for 1967 heroes
Brian Wrigglesworth
Cyril Kellett
January 2013
May 2012
Brian Wrigglesworth R.I.P
Brian Wrigglesworth: Obituary

1930s births
2015 deaths
Bramley RLFC players
Doncaster R.L.F.C. players
English rugby league coaches
English rugby league players
Featherstone Rovers players
Hull Kingston Rovers players
Place of birth missing
Rugby league centres
Rugby league five-eighths
Rugby league fullbacks
Year of birth missing
Yorkshire rugby league team players